Kalleshvara temple (also spelt Kallesvara or Kalleshwara)is located in the town of Bagali (called Balgali in ancient inscriptions) near to Harpanahalli town in the Davangere district of Karnataka state, India.

Construction
The construction of the temple spans the rule of two Kannada dynasties: the Rashtrakuta Dynasty during the mid-10th century, and the Western Chalukya Empire, during the reign of founding King Tailapa II (also called Ahava Malla) around 987 AD. (the dynasty is also called Later or Kalyani Chalukya). The consecration of the temple was done by an individual called Duggimayya. Art historian Adam Hardy classifies the architectural style of the temple as "Late Rashtrakuta vimana (shrine and tower) with erotic carvings, and a closed mantapa (hall), fronted by a Later Chalukya non-mainstream open mantapa, the building material for which is soapstone". The existing tower over the shrine may be a later day re-construction. The temple, whose premises have yielded thirty-six old Kannada inscriptions (danashasana, lit, describing donations) from the 10th and 11th centuries, is protected as a monument of national importance by the Archaeological Survey of India.

Temple plan and decoration

The temple plan comprises a main shrine for the Hindu god Shiva with a sanctum (cella or garbhagriha) facing east, a vestibule (antechamber or antarala), a main closed hall (mahamantapa) with an entrance in the south and east. These structures are attributed to the 10th century Rashtrakuta rule. The closed hall is preceded by a large, open gathering hall (sabhamandapa) with fifty highly ornate lathe turned pillars that support a decorative ceiling. Also provided are a shrine for the Sun god Surya with a hall (mukhamandapa) facing the east-west orientation, and a small shrine for the deity Narasimha (a form of the Hindu god Vishnu) in the north of the gathering hall. These constructions are ascribed to the Western Chalukya rule. In all, there are eight small shrines built around the main shrine. Of the fifty pillars, twenty four pillars are located over the platform (jagati) provided with a balcony seating (kakshasana). The door ways (doorjamb and lintel) of the eastern doorway that faces the Nandi (bull, a companion of the Hindu god Shiva), and the southern doorway that forms an entry into the close hall are intricately decorated. A few independent sculptures from the late Chalukyan period are found in the closed hall. These include Shiva, Umamahesvara (Shiva with his consort Parvati), Ganesha, Kartikeya, Surya, Anantasayana (the god Vishnu seated on a snake), Sarasvati and Mahishamardini (a form of the goddess Durga).

See also
 Kalleshwara Temple, Hire Hadagali
 Kalleshvara Temple, Ambali

Notes

Gallery

References

Adam Hardy, Indian Temple Architecture: Form and Transformation : the Karṇāṭa Drāviḍa Tradition, 7th to 13th Centuries, Abhinav, 1995, New Delhi, .

Western Chalukya Empire
Chalukya dynasty
Hindu temples in Davanagere district